SS Empire Kestrel was a ,  cargo ship built by Great Lakes Engineering Works of Ecorse, Michigan. Completed in 1919 as SS Lake Ellithorpe for the United States Shipping Board (USSB), she was sold to the New England, New York & Texas Steamship Corporation of New York in 1927, then to the Newtex Steamship Corporation of New York City in 1928. In 1932, she was renamed Texas Trader. In 1940 she was sold to the Ministry of War Transport. Reflagged as a British ship and renamed Empire Kestrel, she was managed by William Reardon Smith & Sons Co.

She was attacked on 16 August 1943 by an Italian Savoia-Marchetti S.79 aircraft, piloted by Lt. Vezio Terzi, and sunk by an aerial torpedo off the coast Algeria, near Bgayet, in position  while part of Convoy UGS-13.

References 

Design 1074 ships
Great Lakes freighters
Ships built in Ecorse, Michigan
1919 ships
Empire ships
World War II merchant ships of the United Kingdom
Ships sunk by Italian aircraft
World War II shipwrecks in the Mediterranean Sea
Maritime incidents in August 1943
Merchant ships sunk by aircraft